Saser Pass,  Saser La, or Sasser Pass  (el. ) is a high mountain pass in Ladakh and India on the ancient summer caravan route from Leh in Ladakh to Yarkand in the Tarim Basin. It leads from the head of the Nubra Valley into the upper Shyok valley, on the way to the even higher, but easier, Karakoram Pass.

History
"This was the notorious Sasser, not the highest but probably the most impressive and dangerous [of the passes along the caravan route between Ladakh and Yarkand]."

The Saser Pass could not be avoided in summer and took a huge toll on caravan pack animals, such as ponies and mules. It was too icy for the Bactrian camels, which were the usual pack animals to the north of the Saser Pass.

Saser Pass lies 37 km southeast of the Siachen Glacier area that the 1972 Simla Agreement between India and Pakistan failed to define clearly.

References

Further reading
Trans-Himalayan Caravans: Merchant Princes and Peasant Traders in Ladakh. Janet Rizvi. Oxford University Press. New Delhi. 1999. .

Mountain passes of Ladakh
Mountain passes of the Karakoram
Mountain passes of the Himalayas